Barron Patrick Richter (born September 11, 1970) is an American former professional ice hockey defenseman. Richter most recently played in the Nationalliga A league in Switzerland for EV Zug. He also played in the NHL with the New York Rangers, Boston Bruins, New York Islanders, and Montreal Canadiens. In 2015, Richter was inducted into the Madison Sports Hall of Fame.

Playing career

Richter was drafted out of high school (Culver Military Academy) by the Hartford Whalers in the second round, 32nd overall in the 1988 NHL Entry Draft. After being drafted Richter attended college, playing for the University of Wisconsin–Madison for 4 years. While in college he was named to the NCAA Championship All-Tournament Team in 1992, the WCHA first All-Star Team in 1993, and the NCAA West First All-American Team, also in 1993. Richter also made his international team debut, representing the United States in the World Junior Ice Hockey Championship in 1989 and 1990 and the Ice Hockey World Championship in 1992 and 1993.

After college, Richter spent the majority of the 1993–94 season representing the United States in tournaments. He played 56 games with the U.S. National Team, playing in the 1994 Ice Hockey World Championship and the 1994 Winter Olympics. That season he also made his professional debut with the Binghamton Rangers of the AHL, appearing in 21 games.

Richter spent the majority of the next two seasons with the Binghamton Rangers. He made his NHL debut with the New York Rangers during the 1995–96 season, appearing in four games. The following year he signed with the Boston Bruins, spending the majority of the 1996–97 season with the Bruins, playing 50 games. He played the 1997–98 season with the Providence Bruins before signing with the New York Islanders in 1998. Richter then played the 1998–99 season with the Islanders, his only full season in the NHL, while also making his final international appearance in the 1999 Ice Hockey World Championship.

Following the 1998–99 season, Richter was released and picked up by the Montreal Canadiens. However, he was not able to crack the starting lineup and appeared in only 25 games over 2 years with the Canadiens. Following the 2000–01 season Richter played in the Elitserien for two years. After his stint there he joined EV Zug in the Nationalliga A League.

In 2015, Richter was inducted into the Madison Sports Hall of Fame.

Awards and honors

Career statistics

Regular season and playoffs

International

References

External links
 

1970 births
Living people
American men's ice hockey defensemen
Binghamton Rangers players
Boston Bruins players
EV Zug players
Hartford Whalers draft picks
HC Lugano players
Sportspeople from Madison, Wisconsin
Ice hockey players from Wisconsin
Ice hockey players at the 1994 Winter Olympics
Linköping HC players
Manitoba Moose (IHL) players
Montreal Canadiens players
New York Islanders players
New York Rangers players
Olympic ice hockey players of the United States
Providence Bruins players
Quebec Citadelles players
Wisconsin Badgers men's ice hockey players
NCAA men's ice hockey national champions
Culver Academies alumni
AHCA Division I men's ice hockey All-Americans